If I Only Knew is the eighth studio album of American girl group the Emotions, released in 1985 by Motown Records. The album reached No. 11 on the UK Blues & Soul Hiplist chart.

Critical reception

AllMusic gave the album a three out of five star rating. With an 8 out of 10 grade Blues & Soul found that "the album is the kind of statement as to what they've done before and where they're heading off to. The Good Times and Eternally are the kind of classy ballads we've come to expect from the trio while Supernatural dabbles in pop funk and Miss Your Love hits a rock blues vein". Jack Lloyd of The Philadelphia Inquirer gave a three out of four star rating and wrote "Motown-influenced girl groups certainly aren't as hot as they were in the 1960s, but this veteran trio is carrying on the tradition nicely, maintaining the basic sound while updating the production. Lloyd added "the Emotions shift nicely between such soulful, upbeat numbers as "Miss Your Love" and more sophisticated numbers such as "Good Times."

Tracklisting

Charts

References

1985 albums
The Emotions albums
Motown albums